Sayed Muhammad Hassan Sharifi Balkhabi is a politician and representative of the people of Sar-e Pol province during the 16th session of the Afghanistan Parliament.

Early life 
Sayed Muhammad Hassan Sharifi Balkhabi, was born in 1974 in Balkhab District of Sar-e Pol Province, Afghanistan.

Balkhabi completed his elementary and secondary education at a school in Balkhab district of Sar-e Pol province in 1995. In 2001, he obtained a Master's Degree in Islamic religious studies at the University of Qom in Qom, Iran. Balkhabi is a member of Hezbe Wahdat party.

References 

Living people
1974 births
Hazara politicians
Hezbe Wahdat politicians